Dannij van der Sluijs (born 24 September 1963) is a Dutch politician representing the Party for Freedom. He has been a member of the States of North Holland since 10 March 2011 and a member of the Senate from 28 March 2017 to 11 June 2019.

References

External links 
 Dannij van der Sluijs at the website of the Senate

1963 births
21st-century Dutch politicians
Living people
Members of the Provincial Council of North Holland
Members of the Senate (Netherlands)
Party for Freedom politicians
Politicians from Haarlem